The Eastern Tepuis (Spanish: Tepuyes Orientales), also known as the Roraima–Ilú range, is a mountain chain stretching for some  along the border between Guyana, Venezuela and, to a small extent, Brazil. It runs in a northwesterly direction from the tripoint of these countries, closely following the Guyana–Venezuela border, with a single major peak (Uei-tepui) to the south, on the Brazil–Venezuela border. Moving northwest from Uei-tepui (2,150 m), the main summits of this chain are Roraima-tepui (2,810 m), Kukenán-tepui (2,650 m), Yuruaní-tepui (2,400 m), Wadakapiapué-tepui (2,000 m), Karaurín-tepui (2,500 ), Ilú-tepui (2,700 m), and Tramen-tepui. The minor peak of Wei-Assipu-tepui lies entirely outside Venezuela, on the border between Brazil and Guyana. Additionally, there are a number of minor plateaus which form a chain between Uei-tepui and Roraima-tepui. Ilú- and Tramen-tepuis are often treated together since they are joined by a common base.

It includes some of the best known and most widely visited tepuis, particularly Roraima and nearby Kukenán.

See also
 Distribution of Heliamphora

References

Inselbergs of South America
Tepuis of Venezuela
Mountain ranges of Brazil
Mountain ranges of Guyana
Mountain ranges of Venezuela
Mountains of Bolívar (state)
Landforms of Roraima
Tepuis of Brazil
Tepuis of Guyana